Edward Szmidt (4 August 1931 – 29 April 2018) was a Polish sprinter. He competed in the men's 200 metres at the 1956 Summer Olympics.

References

1931 births
2018 deaths
Athletes (track and field) at the 1956 Summer Olympics
Polish male sprinters
Olympic athletes of Poland
Place of birth missing